Slices of Life may refer to:
 Slices of Life (2010 film), an American horror film
 Slices of Life (1985 film), a French comedy-sci fi film